Hossam or Hussam or Hosam or Husam is an Arabic/Semitic male given name and surname. It means the sharp sword or a cutting blade. In some traditions it translates to "sword of justice" or "sword that divides justice and injustice". Notable people with the name include:

Given name
Hossam Abdelmoneim (born 1975), Egyptian football player
Hossam AlJabri, activist, preacher and speaker on Islam and Muslims
Hossam Mohammed Amin, Iraqi general under Saddam Hussein's government
Hossam Arafat (Egyptian football player) (born 1990), Egyptian footballer
Hossam Arafat (Palestinian politician)
Hossam Ashour, (born 1986), Egyptian footballer
Hossam El-Badry (born 1960), Egyptian football manager and former footballer
Hossam Bahgat (born c. 1978), Egyptian human rights activist and investigative journalist
Hossam Eisa, Egyptian politician and academic
Hussam Fawzi, Iraqi footballer
Hossam Ghaly (born 1981), Egyptian football midfielder
Hossam Habib (born 1980), Egyptian singer
Hossam el-Hamalawy (born 1977), Egyptian journalist, blogger, photographer and socialist activist
Hossam Hassan (born 1966), Egyptian association football player
Hossam Hassan (born 1989), Egyptian footballer
Hossam Katerji (born 1982) Syrian businessman and member of Syrian parliament
Husam ad-Din Manikpuri, Indian Muslim theologian
Hossam Ramzy, Egyptian professional percussionist, composer and music arranger
Hussam Al-Rassam, Iraqi singer
Hossam Al-Sabah, Lebanese actor
Hussam bin Saud Al Saud (born 1960), Saudi royal
Husam Waksa (born 1982) Malaysian Royalty, young corporate figure
Hossam Ould Zmirli (born 1984), Algerian football player

Surname
Youssef Hossam (born 1998), Egyptian tennis player banned from tennis for life

Arabic masculine given names